MacScan is anti-malware software for macOS developed by SecureMac.

Features
SecureMac runs on Apple macOS. It scans for and removes malware (including spyware, Trojan horses, keystroke loggers, and tracking cookies). It also scans for remote administration programs, like Apple Remote Desktop, allowing users to verify that such programs are installed only with their authorization.

The full version is available as shareware.

Unlike other anti-malware applications available for Mac OS X (and other systems), MacScan scans exclusively for malware that affects Macs, as opposed to scanning for all forms of known threats, which would include Windows malware. Given that there is considerably less macOS malware than Windows-based malware, MacScan's definition files are smaller and more optimized.

See also
List of Macintosh software

References

External links
'Review: MacScan 3', Macworld, May 3, 2016
'Review: MacScan 2.9.4', CNET Editor Review, February 26, 2013
'Review: MacScan 2.6', Softpedia, February 15, 2009
'Review: MacScan 2.6', Brighthub, January 15, 2009
'6 hot Macworld apps for business', CNN Money, January 7, 2009
'Review: MacScan 2.1', Macworld, July 17, 2006
'Review: MacScan 2.5', Laptop Magazine, April 22, 2008
'Review MacScan 2', MacWorld UK, May 14, 2008
'MacScan and Your Trojan Lesson', Apple Matters, April 27, 2006

MacOS security software
Spyware removal